2009–10 Moldovan Cup was the nineteenth season of the Moldovan annual football tournament. The competition started on 16 September 2009 with the first round and ended with the final held in spring 2010. The defending champions were Sheriff, who won their sixth cup final last season, and defended their title this season.

First round
This round involved 16 teams, including four from the Moldovan National Division: CSCA-Rapid, Academia, Viitorul Orhei and Sfîntul Gheorghe. These matches took place on 16 September 2009.

|}

Second round
This round featured the eight winners from the previous round as well as the eight remaining clubs from the Moldovan National Division. The matches were played on 30 September 2009 except for the match between Sheriff and CSCA-Rapid, which took place on 22 November 2009.

|}

Quarterfinals
This round featured the eight winners from the previous round and was played over two legs. The first legs were played on 22 November 2009 and the second legs were played on 28 November 2009 except for the matches between Sheriff and Academia, which were played on 23 February and 30 March 2010.

|}

Semifinals
This round featured the four winners from the previous round and is played over two legs. The first legs took place on 14 April 2010 and the second legs took place on 28 April 2010.

|}

Final

Top goalscorers

References
 Federatia Moldoveneasca de Fotbal - Cupa R. Moldova 

Moldovan Cup seasons
Moldovan Cup 2009-10
Moldova